A scone is a type of quick-bread, typically eaten with jam then cream.

Scone may also refer to:

People
Barbara Young, Baroness Young of Old Scone (born 1948), Labour member of the House of Lords
Robert of Scone (died 1159), 12th century bishop of Cell Rígmonaid (or Kilrymont, now St Andrews)

Places and related meanings

Australia
Scone, New South Wales, Australia (named after the Scottish burgh by emigrants)
Scone Grammar School, Australian independent Anglican school
Scone High School, Australian government high school
Scone Horse Festival, celebration of Scone's cultural links to equines
Scone railway station, New South Wales
Scone Thoroughbreds, country rugby league team
The Scone Advocate, Australian local newspaper

Scotland
Scone, Scotland, a village in Perth and Kinross
Abbot of Scone
The Ba' of Scone
Scone Abbey
Scone Palace
Stone of Scone

See also
 Scone (category theory), a special kind of comma category
 Drop-scone, British word for a small pancake
 Frybread, called "scones" in Utah and southern Idaho